Carlo Francesco Dotti (baptized January 1, 1670 –  June 3, 1759) was an Italian architect from Bologna.

Life

Carlo Francesco Dotti was born and died in Bologna, where he became one of the main protagonists of the late Baroque style.

His most famous work is the Sanctuary of the Madonna di San Luca, Bologna, which is raised on a hilltop above the city, consisting of a church topped by an elliptical dome, with extensions leading to two pentagonal pavilions.

In the first half of the eighteenth century he worked on the church of San Donato of Bologna, the university library and several palaces in the center of the city. In the Palazzo Davia Bargellini he executed the monumental staircase around 1730. He was also known for the Arch of Meloncello (1721); the altar of Ivo of Kermartin in the San Petronio Basilica; and the Renazzo parish church, in the town of Cento in the Province of Ferrara. 

A street is named after him next to the road that leads up the Sanctuary of the Madonna di San Luca, just outside the center of Bologna.

Principal works

Sanctuary of the Madonna of San Luca, 1723 - 1757 (Bologna)
Restoration of the Basilica of San Domenico (Bologna), 1728 - 1732
Reading room of the library of the University of Bologna
Palazzo Agucchi, now Palazzo Bosdari, Bologna
Palazzo Monti, now Palazzo Salina, Bologna
Palazzo Poggi, Bologna
Project for the great stairway of the Palazzo Davia Bargellini, Bologna
Design for the Colonna dell'Immacolata, Piazza Malpighi, Bologna
Arco del Meloncello, Bologna, 1732
Parish church of San Giovanni, Minerbio
Restoration of Malatesta temple, Rimini

References
Citations

Sources

1670 births
1759 deaths
18th-century Italian architects
Architects from Bologna